Sekolah Jenis Kebangsaan (Cina) Chung Hua Batu 4 1/2 is a primary school situated on Jalan Kong Ping in Kuching, Sarawak, Malaysia. The school opened in 1932.

Built on a  site, the school has 27 classrooms, a staffroom, administrative offices, a canteen, library, science labs, computer lab, and a basketball court which doubles as an assembly area.

History
The school was opened on 1 July 1932. Not much is known during its early years as documentation on the school is scarce. However, a fire broke out some time in 1995 prompting a rebuilding of the school. The rebuilt school was opened in 1996.

The school is set to celebrate its 90th anniversary in the year 2022.

Classes
The school currently has 27 classes total. From year 1 to 3 there are only 4 classes for each grade, whereas from year 4 to 6 there are 5 classes for each grade. Each class is colour coded with different colours however the names of the classes are based on individual human traits. Prior to this however, the classes were actually named after colours.

School magazine
The school magazine does not have an official name however it is published yearly and still continues to do so. It features academic and cocurricular achievements, essays written by students, class photos, school staff photos, and pictures of various school activities.

Schools in Sarawak
Primary schools in Malaysia
Chinese-language schools in Malaysia
Educational institutions established in 1932
1996 establishments in Malaysia